Caris is a given name. 
Its origin is Welsh.

It means 'grace of God'.

It also means 'merciful grace of God'. CARIS has multiple meaning as Love/beloved/grace/ due to grace.

It is a very unique name for girls.
It is pronounced as ca(cat)- ri(river)- s(sun) / ca-ri-s

Given name
Caris LeVert (born 1994), American basketball player 
Caris Tiivel, Australian model and beauty pageant

Fictional characters with the given name
Caris Wooler, one of the main characters in the Ken Follett novel World Without End

Surname
George Caris (1927–2013), Australian rules footballer 
Gerard Caris (born 1925), Dutch sculptor and artist 
Magnus Caris (born 1968), Swedish darts player

See also

Cari (name)
Karas (surname)

Masculine given names
Feminine given names